The 1945 USC Trojans football team represented the University of Southern California (USC) in the 1945 college football season. In their fourth year under head coach Jeff Cravath, the Trojans compiled a 7–4 record (5–1 against conference opponents), won the Pacific Coast Conference championship, lost to Alabama in the 1946 Rose Bowl, and outscored their opponents by a combined total of 205 to 150.

Schedule

References

USC
USC Trojans football seasons
Pac-12 Conference football champion seasons
USC Trojans football